Fareeha Jabeen  (Punjabi) also spelled as Fariha Jabeen is a Pakistani actress. She used to appear in PTV Home's classic serials in 1990's. She has also appeared in few Urdu films. She has played a role of Nagina Chachi in Hum TV's acclaim series Suno Chanda 2.

Personal life
Jabeen is from Lahore and currently resides in Karachi. She is of Punjabi background. Actress Amar Khan is her daughter.

Filmography

Film
Gulabo (2008)
7 Din Mohabbat In (2018)
Wrong No. 2 (2019)

Television

References

External links

Living people
20th-century Pakistani actresses
21st-century Pakistani actresses
Pakistani television actresses
Pakistani film actresses
Punjabi people
Actresses from Karachi
Actresses from Lahore
Year of birth missing (living people)